Lonchocarpus kanurii is a species of legume in the family Fabaceae.
It is found in Kenya and Somalia.
It is threatened by habitat loss.

Sources
 

kanurii
Flora of Kenya
Flora of Somalia
Near threatened plants
Taxonomy articles created by Polbot
Taxobox binomials not recognized by IUCN